Jernvallen is a multi-use stadium in Sandviken, Sweden. In the 1958 FIFA World Cup there were two matches played at Jernvallen. It has the distinction of being the northernmost stadium to host a World Cup match. It is currently used mostly for football matches.  Although the record for the stadium is 20,000 people in 1958, today the stadium holds 7,000 people.

FIFA World Cup 1958

References

Football venues in Sweden
1958 FIFA World Cup stadiums
Sandvikens IF
Badminton venues